Marco Ragini (born 30 November 1967) is a Sammarinese football manager who last managed Tre Fiori.

Career

In 2014, Ragini was appointed manager of Lithuanian side Dainava. In 2015, he was appointed manager of Locarno in Switzerland. After that, he was appointed manager of Slovak club MFK Dolný Kubín. In 2016, Ragini was appointed manager of Ujana in the Democratic Republic of the Congo. In 2017, he was appointed manager of Nigerian team Garden City Panthers.

In 2018, he was appointed manager of FC Ulaanbaatar in Mongolia. In 2021, Ragini was appointed manager of Malaysian outfit Kelantan. In 2022, he was appointed manager of Tre Fiori in San Marino.

References

External links
 Official website

1967 births
A Lyga managers
Expatriate football managers in Lithuania
Expatriate football managers in Malaysia
Expatriate football managers in Mongolia
Expatriate football managers in Nigeria
Expatriate football managers in Slovakia
Expatriate football managers in Switzerland
Expatriate football managers in the Democratic Republic of the Congo
Living people
Sammarinese football managers